Harbin Commercial University, also known as Harbin University of Commerce, is a university in Harbin, China. It was the first multidisciplinary commercial university in China.

Journals published
Commercial Research
Journal of Harbin Commercial University (Natural Science Edition)
Journal of Harbin Commercial University (Social Science Edition)

External links

Achievements
Developed the China's first food machinery-type 406 dumpling-making machine in 1959.

Universities and colleges in Harbin